Robert Dustin, also known as Dusty, is an American Emmy awarded television producer and director. He is known for his work in television programs such as Halloween! (1994), My Sergi (1998) and Fire on Ice: Champions of American Figure Skating (2001).

Early life and career 
Rob Dustin graduated from the University of Iowa. He began his career working for CBS Sports, covering sports events and remained working there for 17 years until he founded Red Brick Entertainment in 1994.
In 2007, when U.S. Figure Skating created an ice network the International Skating Union hired Dustin and Red Brick Entertainment for providing real TV production using multiple cameras.  His  team consisted of four crew members,  to keep the cost down what Dustin calls “high-speed, low-drag approach”.
In 2010, U.S. Figure Skating Championships, Dustin helped coordinate the coverage of the event. Dustin also is a longtime Coordinating producer in covering the ice skating championships in the Olympics.

Filmography

Awards and honors 
Rob Dustin has been nominated and won numerous times for Sports Emmy Award.

References

External links
 

Living people
American television directors
American television producers
1963 births